The women's elimination race competition at the 2019  UEC European Track Championships was held on 17 October 2019.

Results

References

Women's elimination race
European Track Championships – Women's elimination race